Padaeus is a genus of stink bugs in the family Pentatomidae. There is one described species in Padaeus, P. trivittatus.

References

Further reading

External links

Pentatomidae genera
Articles created by Qbugbot
Pentatomini